III (also called Sahg III) is the third studio album by the Norwegian hard rock band Sahg, released on August 23, 2010, under the Norwegian record label Indie Recordings.

A limited special edition includes a DVD "Race with Time" with a behind the scenes documentary.

A music video was made for the track "Mortify", directed by Tommy Naess.

Track listing

Personnel

Sahg 
Olav Iversen – Vocals, Guitars, Piano (Track 10)
Thomas Tofthagen – Guitars
King – Bass
Thomas Lønnheim	– Drums, Percussion

Guest/session musicians 
Herbrand Larsen – Keyboards, Hammond organ, Vocals (backing)
Lars Hammersland – Keyboards, Hammond organ
Tony Vetaas – Vocals (backing)
Roger Berland	– Piano (Track 10)

Production and engineering 
Martin Kvamme – Cover art
Bård Bøge – Engineering
Kjell Arne Kjærgård – Engineering
Herbrand Larsen – Producer, Engineering, Mixing
Ice Dale – Co-producer, Engineering
Chris Sansom – Mastering
Produced by Sahg and Herbrand Larsen. Co-produced by Ice Dale.
Recorded in Earshot Studio, Grieghallen Studio and Mackverk Studio, Bergen, Norway. 
Mixed by Herbrand Larsen in Earshot Studio.
Mastered by Chris Sansom in Livingroom Studios, Oslo, Norway.

References

External links 
Discogs.com
Metallum Archvies

2010 albums
Sahg albums
Indie Recordings albums